Zarechnoye is a rural locality (a selo) and the administrative center of Novogeorgiyevsky Selsoviet, Limansky District, Astrakhan Oblast, Russia. The population was 1,325 as of 2010. There are 3 streets.

Geography 
Zarechnoye is located 24 km northeast of Liman (the district's administrative centre) by road. Novogeorgiyevsk is the nearest rural locality.

References 

Rural localities in Limansky District